Thody Élie Youan (born 7 April 1999) is a French footballer who plays for Scottish Premiership club Hibernian on loan from St. Gallen.

Club career
On 12 January 2018, Youan signed his first professional contract with his boyhood club FC Nantes. He made his professional debut for Nantes in a 1–0 Ligue 1 loss to RC Strasbourg Alsace on 24 May 2019.

On 17 May 2021, St. Gallen, which previously loaned Youan, exercised the option to purchase his rights.

On 31 January 2022, Youan was loaned to Mechelen in Belgium.

On 25 June 2022, Youan joined Scottish Premiership club Hibernian on a season-long loan deal.

International career
Youan was born in France to Ivorian parents. He is a youth international for France.

References

External links
 
 
 
 

1999 births
Footballers from Nantes
French sportspeople of Ivorian descent
Living people
Association football forwards
French footballers
France youth international footballers
FC Nantes players
FC St. Gallen players
K.V. Mechelen players
Hibernian F.C. players
Ligue 1 players
Championnat National 2 players
Championnat National 3 players
Swiss Super League players
French expatriate footballers
French expatriate sportspeople in Switzerland
Expatriate footballers in Switzerland
French expatriate sportspeople in Belgium
Expatriate footballers in Belgium
French expatriate sportspeople in Scotland
Expatriate footballers in Scotland
Scottish Professional Football League players